Sir John Magill’s Last Journey is a 1930 detective novel by the Irish writer Freeman Wills Crofts. It is the sixth in his series of novels featuring Inspector French, a prominent figure of the Golden Age of Detective Fiction. Much of the novel takes place in Northern Ireland, particularly around Belfast, where Crofts had spent a great deal of his younger years before moving to England. As with many of his puzzle mysteries its solution revolves around railway timetables as well as the possible distance a boat could cover in a certain time.

Crofts' admiration for the Royal Ulster Constabulary, and implicitly the Northern Irish state, is clear throughout the novel although it features little direct reference to politics. In spite of this it was published in the Irish Free State and translated into Gaelic.

Synopsis
When Sir John Magill, the Irish linen millionaire, disappears on a rare visit to Belfast the assistance of Scotland Yard is sought. Magill has some years earlier turned over his business interests to his son Major Malcolm Magill and retired to live in London's Knightsbridge. Assigned to the case, Inspector French travels to Ireland where he collaborates with the local force to follow up various clues, concluding in the discover of Sir John's body in a shallow grave on the edge of Major Magill's country estate outside Belfast. The evidence appears to point to Major Magill's having committed the murder in order to come into a large inheritance from his father, which he needed due to the struggling financial situation of the linen industry.

Returning to England, French's investigations centre on the last journey taken by Sir John Magill on the boat train from Euston to Stanraer and a cruise taken by Sir John's nephew, Victor, on a launch along the coast of Western Scotland. It transpires that Magill had been lured to the North of Ireland by the alleged discovery of a radical synthetic material mixing silk and linen that he hopes will revive the Irish linen industry and make his family's own fortune. Despite much apparent evidence to the contrary, French deduces that Sir John never set foot on Irish soil alive. The investigation reaches its climax on a stormy night at Cavehill above Belfast.

References

Bibliography
 Evans, Curtis. Masters of the "Humdrum" Mystery: Cecil John Charles Street, Freeman Wills Crofts, Alfred Walter Stewart and the British Detective Novel, 1920-1961. McFarland, 2014.
 Foster, John Wilson. Irish Novels 1890-1940: New Bearings in Culture and Fiction. Oxford University Press, 2008.
 Herbert, Rosemary. Whodunit?: A Who's Who in Crime & Mystery Writing. Oxford University Press, 2003.
 Reilly, John M. Twentieth Century Crime & Mystery Writers. Springer, 2015.

1930 British novels
Novels by Freeman Wills Crofts
British crime novels
British mystery novels
British thriller novels
British detective novels
Irish mystery novels
Irish crime novels
Collins Crime Club books
Novels set in Cumbria
Novels set in Devon
Novels set in London
Novels set in Dumfries and Galloway
Novels set in Glasgow
Novels set in Belfast
Novels set in Northern Ireland
Novels set on ships
Novels set on trains